The Piasecki H-16 Transporter (company designation PV-15) was a tandem-rotor transport or rescue helicopter designed by Frank Piasecki and built by Piasecki Helicopter. The prototypes were evaluated by the United States Air Force and Army, but the crash of the second test aircraft led to cancelling the project.

Design and development
Given the company designation PV-15, the tandem-rotor helicopter was designed by company founder Frank Piasecki. The design was publicly shown for the first time on 15 September 1953 at the Philadelphia airport.

Operational history

Crash
On 5 January 1956, the second YH-16 test aircraft crashed while returning to Philadelphia from a test flight over New Jersey. The cause of the crash was later determined to be the aft slip ring, which carried flight data from the instrumented rotor blades to the data recorders in the cabin. The slip ring bearings seized, and the resultant torque load severed the instrumentation standpipe inside the aft rotor shaft. A segment of this steel standpipe tilted over and came into contact with the interior of the aluminum rotor shaft, scribing a deepening groove into it. The rotor shaft eventually failed in flight, which in turn led to the aft blades and forward blades desynchronizing and colliding.

The aircraft was a total loss; the two test pilots, Harold Peterson and George Callahan, were killed. This led to the cancellation not only of the YH-16, but also the planned 69-passenger YH-16B version.

Variants

XH-16/YH-16
 Powered by two Pratt & Whitney R-2180-E Twin Wasp E radial engines and room for 43 troops, one built later converted to a YH-16B.
YH-16A
 Powered by two Allison T38-A-10 1,800 shp turboshaft engines; previously designated XH-27.
YH-16B
 Prototype XH-16A re-engined with two Allison T56-A-5 2,100 shp turboshaft engines.

Specifications (YH-16B)

See also

References

External links

Piasecki H-16 page
"Biggest Transport Helicopter Cruises 150 Miles Per Hour." Popular Mechanics, January 1954, p. 119, bottom of page.

H-16
Piasecki H-16
1950s United States helicopters
Tandem rotor helicopters
Twin-turbine helicopters
Military transport helicopters
Cancelled military aircraft projects of the United States
Aircraft first flown in 1953